Sara J. Myers is a Professor Emerita at Columbia Theological Seminary and former president of the American Theological Library Association. She has been the Director of numerous libraries, as well as taught at a number of universities across the country.

Education 
Sara Myers first received her Bachelor of Arts from Florida University in 1970. She then  earned her Masters in Library Sciences in 1972 at the University of North Carolina at Chapel Hill, followed by  a Doctor of Philosophy in 1990 from Emory University.

Career 
In 1972 she began her work at Duke University as a Cataloger. She briefly held this same position at Pitts Library at Emory University, where she held various positions. These positions included Reference Librarian, Assistant Librarian for Public Services, and Acting Librarian. At the Iliff School of Theology and Union 
Theological Seminary she served as both the Director and a Professor of Theological Bibliography. After her service at both of these schools she moved and became the Director and Professor of Theological Bibliography of the John Bulow Campbell Library at Columbia Theological Seminary. Here she retired and earned the title of Professor Emerita.

She has   published a number of articles and presentations. She was a frequent contributor to The ALA Yearbook of Library and Information Services: A Review of Library Events. Her research includes women in American society, religious biography and autobiography. As a result, she also served as an editor and writer in Encyclopedia of Women and Religion in North America, volume 1.

American Theological Library Association 
Myers has served as both the President and Vice President, in addition to serving on the Board of Directors for five years. As a member of the Special Committee of the Association for International Collaboration she was also instrumental in outreach and international awareness. She sought to increase cooperation between theological libraries across the world and support cooperative projects between the ATLA and other foreign theological library associations.

References 

American librarians
American women librarians
American Christian theologians
University of Florida alumni
UNC School of Information and Library Science alumni
Emory University alumni
Living people
Year of birth missing (living people)
21st-century American women